John E. Brodsky (May 30, 1855 – December 26, 1910) was an American lawyer and politician from New York.

Life 
Brodsky was born on May 30, 1855, in New York City. His father John Brodsky was a Czech immigrant from Beroun and a stave maker that married a German.

Brodsky attended Columbia Law School, graduating from there in 1876. He was admitted to the bar upon graduating. He initially worked as a law clerk, but then he worked as a lawyer as a member of the law firm Johnson, Tilton, and Brodsky. He later moved to Harlem and practiced law with his brother F. W. Brodsky. They had a law office in the Emigrant Savings Bank.

In 1879, Brodsky was elected to the New York State Assembly as a Republican, representing the New York County 8th District. He served in the Assembly in 1880, 1881, 1882, and 1891. While in the Assembly he introduced and pushed for a bill for the consolidation of Manhattan and Brooklyn. In the 1882 United States House of Representatives election, he was the Republican candidate for New York's 7th congressional district. He lost the election to William Dorsheimer. He was expelled from the Republican Party in 1896 and became a Democrat.

Brodsky was married to Bertha Hartwig. They had two daughters.

Brodsky died of dropsy in the German Hospital on December 26, 1910.

References

External links 

 The Political Graveyard

1855 births
1910 deaths
American people of Bohemian descent
American people of German descent
Columbia Law School alumni
Politicians from Manhattan
People from Harlem
Lawyers from New York City
19th-century American lawyers
20th-century American lawyers
19th-century American politicians
Republican Party members of the New York State Assembly
Deaths from edema